Olga Nikolayevna Yegorova (born 28 March 1972 in Novocheboksarsk, Chuvash ASSR) is a Russian distance runner.

Her first international appearance came at the 1990 World Junior Championships in Plovdiv, Bulgaria, where she finished 9th in the 1500m won by future world record holder Qu Yunxia. At the 2000 Summer Olympics she competed in 5000 metres, and she is a double world champion in this event, but like countryfellow Tatyana Tomashova she has concentrated on shorter races since, now competing mainly in the 1500 metres. In this event she finished 11th at the 2004 Summer Olympics and second at the 2005 World Championships.

In 2001, she shared the $1 million jackpot of the IAAF Golden League and in the same year tested positive for EPO which drew protests from her fellow competitors after she was allowed to compete in the World Athletics Championships. Although her urine sample tested positive for EPO, the French authorities failed to take an accompanying blood test and she avoided a suspension on a technicality.

Yegorova was one of seven Russian athletes to be suspended for doping offences ahead of the 2008 Beijing Olympics. On 20 October 2008, it was announced that Yegorova, along with 6 other Russian athletes, would receive two-year doping bans for manipulating drug samples.

International competitions

Personal bests 
1500 metres - 3:59.47 (2005)
Mile run - 4:20.10 (2007)
3000 metres - 8:23.26 (2001)
5000 metres - 14:29.32 (2001)

See also
List of doping cases in athletics
List of World Athletics Championships medalists (women)
List of IAAF World Indoor Championships medalists (women)
Doping at the Olympic Games
List of 5000 metres national champions (women)

References

External links

1972 births
Living people
People from Novocheboksarsk
Sportspeople from Chuvashia
Russian female middle-distance runners
Olympic athletes of Russia
Athletes (track and field) at the 2000 Summer Olympics
Athletes (track and field) at the 2004 Summer Olympics
Goodwill Games medalists in athletics
Competitors at the 1998 Goodwill Games
Competitors at the 2001 Goodwill Games
World Athletics Championships athletes for Russia
World Athletics Championships medalists
World Athletics Championships winners
World Athletics Indoor Championships winners
IAAF Continental Cup winners
Russian Athletics Championships winners
IAAF Golden League winners
Doping cases in athletics
Russian sportspeople in doping cases
Goodwill Games gold medalists in athletics
20th-century Russian women
21st-century Russian women